The Norwegian Comedy Writers' Association is a trade union for writers of revues and other comedy in Norway.

Organisations based in Oslo

Norwegian writers' organisations
Norwegian culture